Windham is an unincorporated community in Johnson County, Iowa, United States.

History
Windham was platted in 1854. Windham's population was 38 in 1902, and 35 in 1925.

Notable person
Willam Healy, United States Circuit Court of Appeals judge, was born in Windham.

Notes

Unincorporated communities in Johnson County, Iowa
Unincorporated communities in Iowa
1854 establishments in Iowa